Microsomal triglyceride transfer protein large subunit is a protein that in humans is encoded by the MTTP gene.

MTP encodes the large subunit of the heterodimeric microsomal triglyceride transfer protein. Protein disulfide isomerase (PDI) completes the heterodimeric microsomal triaglyceride transfer protein, which has been shown to play a central role in lipoprotein assembly. Mutations in MTP can cause abetalipoproteinemia.

Apolipoprotein B48 on chylomicra and Apolipoprotein B100 on LDL, IDL, and VLDL are important for MTP binding.

Interactive pathway map

Pharmacology
Drugs that inhibit MTTP prevent the assembly of apo B-containing lipoproteins thus inhibiting the synthesis of chylomicrons and VLDL and leading to decrease in plasma levels of LDL-C.
 Lomitapide (Juxtapid) was approved by the US FDA for adjunctive treatment of homozygous familial hypercholesterolemia.
 Dirlotapide (Slentrol) and mitratapide (Yarvitan) are veterinary drugs for the management of obesity in dogs.

References

Further reading

Human proteins